Preben Vildalen (born June 6, 1972) is a Norwegian handball player. He played 201 matches and scored 312 goals for the Norway men's national handball team between 1994 and 2007.  He participated at the 2001, 2005 and 2007 World Men's Handball Championship.

References

1972 births
Living people
Norwegian male handball players